Robert Theodor Camillo Dinesen (23 October 1874 – 8 March 1972) was a Danish film actor and director. He was first married to actress Laura Johanne Winter (1882-1930) and secondly to Christine Marie Christensen (1877-1935).  He is buried with his third wife, German actress Margarete Schön, at the Friedhof Heerstraße cemetery in Berlin-Westend.

Selected filmography
 The Abyss (1910)
 Four Devils (1911)
 Dr. X (1915)
 The Secret of the Desert (1918)
 Ilona (1921)
 The Women of Gnadenstein (1921)
 The Passion of Inge Krafft (1921)
 The Inheritance of Tordis (1921)
 Tabitha, Stand Up (1922)
 Tatjana (1923)
 Claire (1924)
 In the Name of the Kaisers (1925)
 If Only It Weren't Love (1925)
 The Fire Dancer (1925)
 Ariadne in Hoppegarten (1928)

References

Bibliography
 Soister, John T. Conrad Veidt on Screen: A Comprehensive Illustrated Filmography. McFarland, 2002.

External links

1874 births
1972 deaths
Film directors from Copenhagen
Danish male film actors
Danish male silent film actors
20th-century Danish male actors
Male actors from Copenhagen